Controlled by Hatred / Feel Like Shit… Déjà Vu is the fourth album by American crossover thrash band Suicidal Tendencies, released on October 17, 1989 by Epic Records. Despite containing re-recorded songs of previously released material, Controlled by Hatred / Feel Like Shit… Déjà Vu is still considered a studio album rather than an EP or a compilation album. It includes four covers of No Mercy, a cover of Los Cycos ("It's Not Easy"), two never-before released tracks ("Just Another Love Song" and "Feel Like Shit… Déjà Vu") and two different versions of "How Will I Laugh Tomorrow" (from the band's 1988 album with the same title): the "video edited" version and the "heavy emotion" version. Controlled by Hatred is the first of three Suicidal Tendencies albums to go gold.

Album information
The album itself is represented as two fictional EPs―the first four tracks are labeled as Controlled by Hatred and the remaining five are labeled as Feel Like Shit… Déjà Vu. It features six new recordings―four of which are covers of No Mercy songs, one is a cover of Los Cycos, an outtake from the previous album's sessions, a shortened version of "How Will I Laugh Tomorrow" (as it is heard in the song's video) and the previously unreleased softer "Heavy Emotion" version of that song. The format of Controlled by Hatred / Feel Like Shit… Déjà Vu has caused confusion. Although it has been referred to as either a compilation album or "a double EP", it is technically the band's fourth full-length studio album.

When the album was recorded in 1989, Suicidal Tendencies did not have an official bassist. Bob Heathcote had left the band shortly after the end of the How Will I Laugh Tomorrow tour, although he did play on both versions of the title track from that album. The identity of the "Stymee" name credited as a bassist on the liner notes of Controlled by Hatred has caused confusion. Contrary to popular belief, "Stymee" is not then-new bassist Robert Trujillo who did not actually perform on the album, in which the bass parts were handled by guitarists Rocky George and Mike Clark. The "Stymee" name was actually an acronym of a quote from Trujillo, who reportedly refused to be credited by his given name, and said "it's S.T. why me." Trujillo can, however, be seen in the album's accompanying videos "Waking the Dead" and the "heavy emotion version" of "How Will I Laugh Tomorrow".

Suicidal Tendencies rarely play any songs from this album live. "Waking the Dead" was one of three songs from Controlled by Hatred / Feel Like Shit… Déjà Vu (along with "Master of No Mercy" and "Feel Like Shit… Déjà Vu") that Suicidal Tendencies debuted on their summer 1989 European tour, and remained a live staple until 1994. It was played again on the Freedumb tour in 1999-2000 and the Join the Army / Deja Vu tour in 2010. The band played "Feel Like Shit… Déjà Vu" for the first time since 1990 at the Electric Ballroom in London on June 27, 2009, and again on their 2012 and 2013 tours. "Master of No Mercy" and "Controlled By Hatred" were last played in 1989 and 1990 respectively, while "Just Another Love Song", "Choosing My Own Way of Life" and "It's Not Easy" have never been played live.

Reception

Controlled by Hatred / Feel Like Shit… Déjà Vu received a positive review from Allmusic's Eduardo Rivadavia, who awards the album three-and-a-half stars out of five, and states, "ST fanatics will no doubt get a kick out of these rarities, which also provide a nice link between [How Will I Laugh Tomorrow] and 1990's stellar follow-up, Lights...Camera...Revolution!."

The album was only a minor success, peaking at #150 on the Billboard 200, making it Suicidal Tendencies' third lowest chart position (their 2013 album 13 and 2016 follow-up World Gone Mad debuted at #187 and #192 respectively). It remained on that chart for five weeks. Music videos for "Waking the Dead" and "How Will I Laugh Tomorrow (Heavy Emotion Version)" were made to promote this release.

Track listing

Song notes
 "Master of No Mercy", "Waking the Dead", "Controlled by Hatred" and "Choosing My Own Way of Life" were compositions by guitarist Mike Clark's previous band No Mercy.
 The "Video Edit" version of "How Will I Laugh Tomorrow" is an edited version of the album version.
 "Just Another Love Song" is an outtake from the recording sessions of How Will I Laugh Tomorrow When I Can't Even Smile Today.
 "Feel Like Shit… Déjà Vu" was a newly recorded track.
 "It's Not Easy" was written in 1984/1985 by frontman Mike Muir for a short-lived project called Los Cycos.
 The "Heavy Emotion Version" of "How Will I Laugh Tomorrow" is an acoustic version of the original.

Personnel
 Mike Muir – lead vocals
 Rocky George – lead guitar
 R. J. Herrera – drums
 Mike Clark – rhythm guitar
 Bob Heathcote – bass on "Just Another Love Song" and both versions of "How Will I Laugh Tomorrow" (uncredited)
 Robert Trujillo – bass – appeared in the videos that promoted the album ("Waking the Dead" and "How Will I Laugh Tomorrow (Heavy Emotion Version)"), however he was not a band member yet at the time the album was being recorded. He joined shortly after the album's completion and refused to be credited by his name, despite the rumour that the "Stymee" in the liner notes was him (Stymee meant "S. T. why me"). Bass parts were recorded by the two guitarists (Rocky George and Mike Clark) and Bob Heathcote.
 Produced by Suicidal Tendencies and Paul Winger, except tracks 2 and 9 produced by Suicidal Tendencies and Mark Dodson
 Engineered by Paul Winger, except tracks 2 and 9
 Assistant engineered by Tom Nellen, except tracks 2 and 9

Chart positions

Album
Billboard (North America)

References

Suicidal Tendencies albums
1989 albums
Albums produced by Mark Dodson
Epic Records albums